Groovy, Laidback and Nasty is the ninth studio album by English electronic band Cabaret Voltaire, released in April 1990 by record label Parlophone.

Background and recording 

Groovy, Laidback and Nasty was recorded in Chicago with veteran house producer Marshall Jefferson.

Content 

John Bush of AllMusic wrote that the album "sounds more groovy than nasty, as Mallinder's vocals sound much more pop-oriented than before", despite "possessing a somewhat dated feel even soon after its release".

Reception 

Groovy, Laidback and Nasty was described as "triumphant" in Peter Buckley's compilation of rock music reviews, The Rough Guide to Rock.

Track listing

All tracks composed by Richard H. Kirk and Stephen Mallinder, except where indicated.

 "Searchin'" (Kirk, Mallinder, Marshall Jefferson) – 5:47
 "Hypnotised" – 5:45
 "Minute by Minute" – 5:07
 "Runaway" – 6:38
 "Keep On (I Got This Feeling)" – 6:12
 "Magic" (Kirk, Mallinder, Marshall Jefferson) – 5:08
 "Time Beats" – 4:55
 "Easy Life" – 6:12
 "Rescue Me (City Lights)" – 4:35 (included only on CD and cassette formats)

Personnel
Cabaret Voltaire

Stephen Mallinder – vocals, keyboards, programming
Richard H. Kirk – keyboards, programming

 Additional personnel

David Josias – percussion on "Searchin'"
Glenn Morimoto – trumpet on "Searchin'"
Paris Brightledge, Bob Bono (Robert Bond) – vocals on "Searchin'" and "Minute by Minute"
Marshall Jefferson – vocals on "Minute By Minute"
Ten City – vocals on "Hypnotised" and "Runaway"
Herb Lawson – guitar on "Runaway"
Steel – rap on "Runaway"
Lorita Grahame – vocals on "Keep On (I Got This Feeling)" and "Time Beats"
Deborah Haslam – vocals on "Time Beats"

References

External links 

 

Cabaret Voltaire (band) albums
1990 albums
Parlophone albums